The Our Lady of Fatima Cathedral Also Jardim Cathedral Is the name that receives a religious building that belongs to the Catholic Church and serves as the cathedral located in the city Jardim in the state of Mato Grosso do Sul in the South American country of Brazil.

The church follows the Roman or Latin rite and is the headquarters of the Catholic Diocese of Jardim (Diocese Viridariensis) that was created in 1981 through the bull "Spiritalibus necessitatibus" of Pope John Paul II. Its complex includes the diocesan miter, the diocesan curia, the center of the pastoral, and the official residence of the priest and bishop of the diocese.

It is under the pastoral responsibility of Bishop João Gilberto de Moura.

See also
Roman Catholicism in Brazil
Our Lady of Fatima

References

Roman Catholic cathedrals in Mato Grosso do Sul